St. Stanislaus Bishop & Martyr's Church is a church designated for Polish immigrants in South Deerfield, Massachusetts, United States. Founded 1908, it is one of the Polish-American Roman Catholic parishes in New England in the Diocese of Springfield in Massachusetts.

The Parish name was changed in 2009 to Holy Family Parish, to accommodate the pastoral planning project of the Bishop of Springfield, Timothy McDonnell.

Bibliography 

 
 The Official Catholic Directory in USA

External links 
 St. Stanislaus Bishop & Martyr - TheCatholicDirectory.com 
 Diocese of Springfield in Massachusetts
 Pastoral planning in Diocese of Springfield in Massachusetts

Roman Catholic parishes of Diocese of Springfield in Massachusetts
Polish-American Roman Catholic parishes in Massachusetts
Deerfield, Massachusetts
1908 establishments in Massachusetts
Christian organizations established in 1908